FabricLive.24 is a 2005 DJ mix compilation album by Diplo.

Critical reception
John Bush of AllMusic gave the album 4 stars out of 5, saying, "Aside from the familiar track selection, Diplo is magnificent in the mix, continually showing why he's one of the most popular party DJs around." Dimitri Nasrallah of Exclaim! called it "one of the most impressive mixes of the year." Meanwhile, Tom Breihan of Pitchfork gave the album a 6.8 out of 10, saying, "the great thing about Diplo has always been his ecstatic embrace of chaos, and we don't get a whole lot of that here."

Track listing

References

External links
 

2005 compilation albums
Diplo albums
Albums produced by Diplo